Verkhny Sayantuy (Deede Saianta) is a rural locality (a selo) in Tarbagataysky District, Republic of Buryatia, Russia. The population was 308 as of 2010. There are 6 streets.

Geography 
Verkhny Sayantuy is located 40 km north of Tarbagatay (the district's administrative centre) by road. Voznesenovka is the nearest rural locality.

References 

Rural localities in Tarbagataysky District